Leeds and the Thousand Islands is a township in the Canadian province of Ontario, located within the United Counties of Leeds and Grenville. The township is located along the Saint Lawrence River, and extends north into rural hamlets and villages. Formerly, this township was divided into three separate townships: Leeds, Lansdowne and Escott townships; these townships amalgamated to form the current township of Leeds and the Thousand Islands.

Communities
The township comprises the communities of Berryton, Black Rapids, Brier Hill, Cheeseborough, Darlingside, Dulcemaine, Ebenezer, Eden Grove, Ellisville, Emery, Escott, Fairfax, Gananoque Junction, Gray's Beach, Greenfield, Grenadier Island, Halsteads Bay, Holland, Ivy Lea, Junetown, La Rue Mills, Lansdowne, Leeds, Legge, Long Point, Lyndhurst, Maple Grove, Mitchellville, Narrows, Oak Leaf, Outlet, Pooles Resort, Quabbin, Rockfield, Rockport, Sand Bay Corner, Seeley's Bay, Selton, Soperton, Sweets Corners, Taylor, Tilley, Union, Warburton, Washburns Corners, Waterton, Willowbank and Wilstead.

Lansdowne

Lansdowne, Ontario is a small village located just north of Ivy Lea, Ontario and 4 km north of Highway 401, at the intersection of Leeds and Grenville  County Roads 3 and 34. It is a part of the township of Leeds and the Thousand Islands. It can be accessed by former Kings Highway 2 (which passes just south of the village) or by Highway 401 at Exit 659.

The Canadian customs point of entry at the top of Interstate 81 on Hill Island identifies itself as Lansdowne 456. There is an independent telephone exchange (+1-613-659-) and a post office (K0E 1L0) in the village.  The administrative offices of the township are located in Lansdowne.

Lyndhurst

The Lansdowne Iron Works, was founded by Wallis Sunderlin on the Gananoque River by 1801. The ironworks enabled the economic development of a small industrial community called Furnace Falls. The iron smelter was destroyed by fire in 1811. Several mills were established in Furnace Falls by Charles and Jonas Jones of Brockville in 1827. The settlement was renamed Lyndhurst by 1846. Camp Hyanto, an Anglican church camp, is also set just off of the village of Lyndhurst. It has been in operation since the 1940s and its motto is, "He who sleeps beneath the pines, sleeps well." The Lansdowne Iron Works was designated a National Historic Site of Canada in 1932. A plaque commemorating the founding of Lyndhurst (Furnace Falls) in 1801 was erected by the Ontario Heritage Foundation. A plaque commemorating the Lyndhurst Bridge, built in 1856–1857, was erected by the Ontario Archaeological and Historic Sites Board. Designed by John Roddick, the masonry arch bridge was erected by contractors Miles Fulford and Simon Ransom.

There is a cultural celebration in Lyndhurst dubbed the "Turkey Fair" celebrated annually on the third Saturday in September. This celebration involves hay-stack decoration, petting zoos, fishing contests for kids, crafts and 50/50 draws.

Rockport

Rockport is a village on the St. Lawrence River with historic homes, restaurants, resorts, boat launch and marinas. It has been a port since the late 1700s and is now a major terminus for Thousand Islands cruise tours. There are bicycle racks, benches, and well marked walking paths with interpretive signs and murals for points of historical interest. Two churches that were founded in the late 1800s remain active. Both reflect the architecture of their time.

For decades boats were built in Rockport; from small wooden St. Lawrence skiffs to large tour boats used on the St. Lawrence River, in Ottawa on the Rideau and Ottawa Rivers, and as far away as Banff National Park in Alberta. Before the building of the Thousand Islands Bridge nearby, ferryboats connected the US and Canada. The area remains famous for boat building, as the industry is producing ice boats that make winter travel to local island homes possible.

Seeley's Bay
Seeley's Bay is at the north west corner of the Township of Leeds and the Thousand Islands and is most known for fishing and its direct access to the UNESCO designated Rideau Canal.  The village was established early in the 19th century as a port of call for steamers going between Kingston and Ottawa on the Rideau Canal.  Located just off Highway 15, about 20 minutes north of the 401 Highway, it still serves as the first full service port of call for boaters coming north on the Rideau.

Climate

Demographics 

Population trend:
 Population in 2016: 9,465
 Population in 2011: 9,277
 Population in 2006: 9,435
 Population in 2001: 9,069
 Population in 1996:
 Front of Escott: 1,383
 Front of Leeds and Lansdowne: 4,897
 Rear of Leeds and Lansdowne: 2,895
 Population in 1991:
 Front of Escott: 1,275
 Front of Leeds and Lansdowne: 4,686
 Rear of Leeds and Lansdowne: 2,774

Mother tongue:
 English as first language: 93.7%
 French as first language: 1.5%
 English and French as first language: 0.1%
 Other as first language: 4.7%

See also
List of townships in Ontario

References

External links

Township municipalities in Ontario
Lower-tier municipalities in Ontario
Municipalities in Leeds and Grenville United Counties
Ontario populated places on the Saint Lawrence River